Jordan Clark is a former American women's soccer player who played for Alavés.

References

External links

1989 births
Women's association football midfielders
American women's soccer players
Deportivo Alavés Gloriosas players
American expatriate sportspeople in Spain
Expatriate women's footballers in Spain
Primera División (women) players
Living people